Gina Oselio (19 November 1858 – 4 May 1937) was a Norwegian operatic mezzo-soprano. Her signature role was the title heroine in Georges Bizet's Carmen.

Personal life
Oselio was born in Christiania as Ingeborg Mathilde Laura Aas, a daughter of saddle maker Even Pedersen Aas and Nicoline Engelstad. She married actor and theatre director Bjørn Bjørnson in 1893, and their marriage was dissolved in 1909.

Career
Oselio studied singing in her native country with Fritz Arlberg, with Fredrika Stenhammar in Sweden and with Mathilde Marchesi in Paris. She made her professional opera debut in 1879 at the Royal Swedish Opera. In 1882 Oscar II of Sweden and Norway bestowed upon her the title of "hofsangerinde". In 1902 she was awarded a medal by the King. She was also named an honorary member of the Norsk Operasangerforbund and was a recipient of the Litteris et Artibus.

References

Sources
Biography of Gina Oselio

1858 births
1937 deaths
Litteris et Artibus recipients
20th-century Norwegian women opera singers
Norwegian operatic mezzo-sopranos
19th-century Norwegian women opera singers